The men's marathon event at the 1954 British Empire and Commonwealth Games was held on 7 July in Vancouver, Canada with a start and finish at the Empire Stadium.

Jim Peters, then the world record holder in the marathon, entered the stadium some seventeen minutes ahead of his nearest rival. He collapsed in his final lap of the stadium, however, and did not finish the race (which was won by Joe McGhee).

Results

References

Athletics at the 1954 British Empire and Commonwealth Games
1954